Incredible Mama, is a 2015 superhero action comedy television series produced by Hong Kong Television Network. Originally 25 episodes, the series was condensed into 9. The first episode premiered on February 9, 2015.

Cast
 Kara Hui as Chung-Sam Fat-yuen (鍾沈法婉)
She is actually the famous gangster Black Rose (黑玫瑰), one of the gang Justice Union (正義聯盟), who is wanted by the police force. The wife of Chung Hok-saang, the mother of Chung Lok-shan, Lok-seoi and Lok-guk.
 David Chiang as Chung Hok-saang (鍾學笙)
One of the writers of Sat Daily (實報), the newspaper. The husband of Fat-yuen, father of Lok-shan, Lok-seoi and Lok-guk. Finally discover that Fat-yuen is the gangster Black Rose who is wanted by the police and disappointed in her.
 Sam Chan as Chung Lok-shan (鍾樂山)
 An ordinary police officer, the son of Fat-yuen and Hok-saang. The boyfriend of Anna.
 Carlos Chan as Chung Lok-tin (鍾樂田)
Originally named Luk Gwan-chi (陸君梓). Adopted by Fat-yuen and Hok-saang. He's actually the son of Sir Luk Gwan-chong.
 Maggie Wong as Chung Lok-seoi (鍾樂水)
A form 6 secondary school student. She's actually the gangster Little Hero.
 Henry Leung as Chung Lok-guk (鍾樂谷)
 A form 1 secondary school student.
 Dominic Lam as Sir Luk Gwan-chong (陸君莊警司)
 A policeman who is actually the gangster White General. The father of Chung Lok-tin (originally named Luk Gwan-chi).
 Felix Lok as Hung Shue-lam (洪樹臨)
 The owner of the Hung-shue Group who is actually the gangster Red-flower Man (紅花俠).
 Mimi Kung as To Hoi-wing (杜凱詠)
One of the gangsters who named Golden Cat of Justice Union. 
 Kathy Yuen as Anna Tai On-nah/ Angelina Tai On-kei
 Mannor Chan as Ngau Siu-chun (牛小津) (Yellow Bird)
One of the gangsters of Justice Union.
 Adrian Wong
 Pai Piao as Sau Sin-fung (仇先鋒)
 Nicknamed North Point Captain. A former policeman who worked in the North Point Police Station.
 Luvin Ho
 Mason Chiu
 Cheng Ka-sang as Gam Yim-lo (金閻羅) / Lo Yim-gam (羅炎金)
 The head of a gang.
 Hui Ming-chi
 Kwok Fung as Fok Dak-wah (霍德華)
 Janice Ting as Vanessa (雲妮沙特普)
 Candy Chu
 Shek Sau as Lung Man-san (龍文新), guest star episode 1
 Yu Mo-lin, episode 4
 Casper Chan, episode 5

References

External links
 Official website

Hong Kong Television Network original programming
2015 Hong Kong television series debuts
2010s Hong Kong television series